José Higueras was the defending champion, but lost in the quarterfinals to Tomas Smid.

Henri Leconte won the title by defeating Gene Mayer 7–6(11–9), 6–0, 1–6, 6–1 in the final.

Seeds

Draw

Finals

Top half

Bottom half

References

External links
 Official results archive (ATP)
 Official results archive (ITF)

Stuttgart Singles
Singles 1984